Abderhalden–Kaufmann–Lignac syndrome (AKL syndrome), also called nephropathic cystinosis, is an autosomal recessive renal disorder of childhood comprising cystinosis and renal rickets.

Presentation
Affected children are developmentally delayed with dwarfism, rickets and osteoporosis. Renal tubular disease is usually present causing aminoaciduria, glycosuria and hypokalemia.

Cysteine deposition is most evident in the conjunctiva and cornea.

Diagnosis

Eponym
It is named for Emil Abderhalden, Eduard Kaufmann and George Lignac.

See also
 Cystinosin

References

External links 

Autosomal recessive disorders
Syndromes affecting the kidneys